The Sleepwalkers is a 2019 Argentine drama film directed by Paula Hernández. It was selected as the Argentine entry for the Best International Feature Film at the 93rd Academy Awards, but it was not nominated. It received the Silver Condor award for Best Film from the Argentine Film Critics Association in 2021.

Synopsis
Tensions arise in a family while they are on their summer holiday in Argentina.

Cast
 Érica Rivas as Luisa
 Ornella D'Elía as Ana
 Marilú Marini as Memé
 Luis Ziembrowski as Emilio
 Daniel Hendler as Sergio

See also
 List of submissions to the 93rd Academy Awards for Best International Feature Film
 List of Argentine submissions for the Academy Award for Best International Feature Film

References

External links
 

2019 films
2019 drama films
Argentine drama films
2010s Spanish-language films
2010s Argentine films